Dziękuję Poland Live '83 is the sixteenth album by Klaus Schulze. It was originally released in 1983, and in 2006 was the seventeenth Schulze album reissued by Revisited Records. "Katowice" is essentially a live version of "Spielglocken" from Audentity. "Lodz" is essentially a live version of "Ludwig II von Bayern" from X. "Dzien dobry!" is an alternate take of "Katowice"/"Spielglocken".

Track listing
All tracks composed by Klaus Schulze.

Disc 1

Disc 2

Personnel
Klaus Schulze – synthesizer, guitar, keyboards, vocals, Moog synthesizer, Fairlight
Rainer Bloss – synthesizer, keyboards, computers

External links
 Dziekuje Poland Live '83 at the official site of Klaus Schulze
 

Klaus Schulze albums
Klaus Schulze live albums
1983 live albums